Isotalo is a Finnish surname. Notable people with the surname include:

 Antti Isotalo (1831–1911), Finnish farmer and criminal
 Antti Isotalo (Jäger)
 Markku Yli-Isotalo (1952–2011), Finnish wrestler
 Pentti Isotalo (1927–2021), Finnish ice hockey player

Finnish-language surnames